South Africa, officially the Republic of South Africa (RSA), is the southernmost country in Africa. It also completely enclaves the country Lesotho. It is the southernmost country on the mainland of the Old World, and the second-most populous country located entirely south of the equator, after Tanzania. South Africa is a biodiversity hotspot, with unique biomes, plant and animal life. South Africa has three capital cities, with the executive, judicial and legislative branches of government based in Pretoria, Bloemfontein, and Cape Town respectively. The largest city is Johannesburg.

About 80% of the population are Black South Africans. The remaining population consists of Africa's largest communities of European (White South Africans), Asian (Indian South Africans and Chinese South Africans), and multiracial (Coloured South Africans) ancestry. South Africa is a multiethnic society encompassing a wide variety of cultures, languages, and religions. Its pluralistic makeup is reflected in the constitution's recognition of 11 official languages, the fourth-highest number in the world. According to the 2011 census, the two most spoken first languages are Zulu (22.7%) and Xhosa (16.0%). The two next ones are of European origin: Afrikaans (13.5%) developed from Dutch and serves as the first language of most Coloured and White South Africans; English (9.6%) reflects the legacy of British colonialism and is commonly used in public and commercial life.

The country is one of the few in Africa never to have had a coup d'état, and regular elections have been held for almost a century. However, the vast majority of Black South Africans were not enfranchised until 1994. During the 20th century, the black majority sought to claim more rights from the dominant white minority, which played a large role in the country's recent history and politics. The National Party imposed apartheid in 1948, institutionalising previous racial segregation. After a long and sometimes violent struggle by the African National Congress and other anti-apartheid activists both inside and outside the country, the repeal of discriminatory laws began in the mid-1980s. Since 1994, all ethnic and linguistic groups have held political representation in the country's liberal democracy, which comprises a parliamentary republic and nine provinces. South Africa is often referred to as the "rainbow nation" to describe the country's multicultural diversity, especially in the wake of apartheid.

South Africa is a middle power in international affairs; it maintains significant regional influence and is a member of both the Commonwealth of Nations and the G20. It is a developing country, ranking 109th on the Human Development Index, the 7th highest on the continent. It has been classified by the World Bank as a newly industrialised country and has the third-largest economy and the most industrialized, technologically advanced economy in Africa overall as well as the 39th-largest economy in the world. South Africa has the most UNESCO World Heritage Sites in Africa. Since the end of apartheid, government accountability and quality of life have substantially improved. However, crime, poverty and inequality remain widespread, with about 40% of the total population being unemployed , while some 60% of the population lived under the poverty line and a quarter under $2.15 a day.

Etymology 

The name "South Africa" is derived from the country's geographic location at the southern tip of Africa. Since 1994, the country has had an official name in each of its 11 official languages.

 Mzansi, derived from the Xhosa noun  meaning "south", is a colloquial name for South Africa, while some Pan-Africanist political parties prefer the term "Azania".

History

Prehistoric archaeology 

South Africa contains some of the oldest archaeological and human-fossil sites in the world. Archaeologists have recovered extensive fossil remains from a series of caves in Gauteng Province. The area, a UNESCO World Heritage Site, has been branded "the Cradle of Humankind". The sites include Sterkfontein, one of the richest sites for hominin fossils in the world, as well as Swartkrans, Gondolin Cave, Kromdraai, Cooper's Cave and Malapa. Raymond Dart identified the first hominin fossil discovered in Africa, the Taung Child (found near Taung) in 1924. Other hominin remains have come from the sites of Makapansgat in Limpopo Province; Cornelia and Florisbad in Free State Province; Border Cave in KwaZulu-Natal Province; Klasies River Caves in Eastern Cape Province; and Pinnacle Point, Elandsfontein and Die Kelders Cave in Western Cape Province.

These finds suggest that various hominid species existed in South Africa from about three million years ago, starting with Australopithecus africanus, followed by Australopithecus sediba, Homo ergaster, Homo erectus, Homo rhodesiensis, Homo helmei, Homo naledi and modern humans (Homo sapiens). Modern humans have inhabited Southern Africa for at least 170,000 years. Various researchers have located pebble tools within the Vaal River valley.

Bantu expansion 

Settlements of Bantu-speaking peoples, who were iron-using agriculturists and herdsmen, were present south of the Limpopo River (now the northern border with Botswana and Zimbabwe) by the 4th or 5th century CE. They displaced, conquered, and absorbed the original Khoisan, Khoikhoi and San peoples. The Bantu slowly moved south. The earliest ironworks in modern-day KwaZulu-Natal Province are believed to date from around 1050. The southernmost group was the Xhosa people, whose language incorporates certain linguistic traits from the earlier Khoisan people. The Xhosa reached the Great Fish River, in today's Eastern Cape Province. As they migrated, these larger Iron Age populations displaced or assimilated earlier peoples. In Mpumalanga Province, several stone circles have been found along with a stone arrangement that has been named Adam's Calendar, and the ruins are thought to be created by the Bakone, a Northern Sotho people.

Portuguese exploration 

In 1487, the Portuguese explorer Bartolomeu Dias led the first European voyage to land in southern Africa. On 4 December, he landed at Walfisch Bay (now known as Walvis Bay in present-day Namibia). This was south of the furthest point reached in 1485 by his predecessor, the Portuguese navigator Diogo Cão (Cape Cross, north of the bay). Dias continued down the western coast of southern Africa. After 8 January 1488, prevented by storms from proceeding along the coast, he sailed out of sight of land and passed the southernmost point of Africa without seeing it. He reached as far up the eastern coast of Africa as, what he called, probably the present-day Groot River, in May 1488. On his return he saw the cape, which he named  ('Cape of Storms'). King John II renamed the point , or Cape of Good Hope, as it led to the riches of the East Indies. Dias' feat of navigation was immortalised in Luís de Camões' 1572 epic poem Os Lusíadas.

Dutch colonisation 

By the early 17th century, Portugal's maritime power was starting to decline, and English and Dutch merchants competed to oust Portugal from its lucrative monopoly on the spice trade. Representatives of the British East India Company sporadically called at the cape in search of provisions as early as 1601 but later came to favour Ascension Island and Saint Helena as alternative ports of refuge. Dutch interest was aroused after 1647, when two employees of the Dutch East India Company were shipwrecked at the cape for several months. The sailors were able to survive by obtaining fresh water and meat from the natives. They also sowed vegetables in the fertile soil. Upon their return to Holland, they reported favourably on the cape's potential as a "warehouse and garden" for provisions to stock passing ships for long voyages.

In 1652, a century and a half after the discovery of the cape sea route, Jan van Riebeeck established a  station at the Cape of Good Hope, at what would become Cape Town, on behalf of the Dutch East India Company. Dutch traders also brought thousands of enslaved people to the fledgling colony from Indonesia, Madagascar, and parts of eastern Africa. This led to the development of a new ethnic group, the Cape Coloureds, most of whom adopted the Dutch language and Christian faith.

The eastward expansion of Dutch colonists ushered in a series of wars with the southwesterly migrating Xhosa tribe, known as the Xhosa Wars, as both sides competed for the pastureland near the Great Fish River, which the colonists desired for grazing cattle. The Boers formed loose militias, which they termed commandos, and forged alliances with Khoisan peoples to repel Xhosa raids. Both sides launched bloody but inconclusive offensives, and sporadic violence, often accompanied by livestock theft, remained common for several decades.

British colonisation and the Great Trek

Great Britain occupied Cape Town between 1795 and 1803 to prevent it from falling under the control of the French First Republic, which had invaded the Low Countries. After briefly returning to Dutch rule under the Batavian Republic in 1803, the cape was occupied again by the British in 1806. Following the end of the Napoleonic Wars, it was formally ceded to Great Britain and became an integral part of the British Empire. British emigration to South Africa began around 1818, subsequently culminating in the arrival of the 1820 Settlers. The new colonists were induced to settle for a variety of reasons, namely to increase the size of the European workforce and to bolster frontier regions against Xhosa incursions.

In the first two decades of the 19th century, the Zulu people grew in power and expanded their territory under their leader, Shaka. An offshoot of the Zulu, the Matabele people created a larger empire that included large parts of the highveld under their king Mzilikazi.

They migrated to the future Natal, Free State, and Transvaal regions. The Boers founded the Boer republics: the South African Republic, the Natalia Republic, and the Orange Free State.

The discovery of diamonds in 1867 and gold in 1884 in the interior started the Mineral Revolution and increased economic growth and immigration. This intensified British efforts to gain control over the indigenous peoples. The struggle to control these important economic resources was a factor in relations between Europeans and the indigenous population and also between the Boers and the British.

On 16 May 1876, President Thomas François Burgers of the South African Republic declared war against the Pedi people. King Sekhukhune managed to defeat the army on 1 August 1876. Another attack by the Lydenburg Volunteer Corps was also repulsed. On 16 February 1877, the two parties signed a peace treaty at Botshabelo. The Boers' inability to subdue the Pedi led to the departure of Burgers in favour of Paul Kruger and the British annexation of the South African Republic. In 1878 and 1879 three British attacks were successfully repelled until Garnet Wolseley defeated Sekhukhune in November 1879 with an army of 2,000 British soldiers, Boers and 10,000 Swazis.

The Anglo-Zulu War was fought in 1879 between the British and the Zulu Kingdom. Following Lord Carnarvon's successful introduction of federation in Canada, it was thought that similar political effort, coupled with military campaigns, might succeed with the African kingdoms, tribal areas and Boer republics in South Africa. In 1874, Henry Bartle Frere was sent to South Africa as the British High Commissioner to bring such plans into being. Among the obstacles were the presence of the independent states of the Boers, and the Zululand army. The Zulu nation defeated the British at the Battle of Isandlwana. Eventually Zululand lost the war, resulting in the termination of the Zulu nation's independence.

Boer Wars

The Boer republics successfully resisted British encroachments during the First Boer War (1880–1881) using guerrilla warfare tactics, which were well-suited to local conditions. The British returned with greater numbers, more experience, and new strategy in the Second Boer War (1899–1902) and, although they suffered heavy casualties through attrition, they were ultimately successful. Over 27,000 Boer women and children died in the British concentration camps.

South Africa's urban population grew rapidly from the end of the 19th century onward. After the devastation of the wars, Dutch-descendant Boer farmers fled into cities from the devastated Transvaal and Orange Free State territories to become the class of the white urban poor.

Independence 

Anti-British policies among white South Africans focused on independence. During the Dutch and British colonial years, racial segregation was mostly informal, though some legislation was enacted to control the settlement and movement of indigenous people, including the Native Location Act of 1879 and the system of pass laws.

Eight years after the end of the Second Boer War and after four years of negotiation, the South Africa Act 1909 granted nominal independence while creating the Union of South Africa on 31 May 1910. The union was a dominion that included the former territories of the Cape, Transvaal and Natal colonies, as well as the Orange Free State republic. The Natives' Land Act of 1913 severely restricted the ownership of land by blacks; at that stage they controlled only 7% of the country. The amount of land reserved for indigenous peoples was later marginally increased.

In 1931, the union became fully sovereign from the United Kingdom with the passage of the Statute of Westminster, which abolished the last powers of the Parliament of the United Kingdom to legislate on the country. Only three other African countries—Liberia, Ethiopia, and Egypt—had been independent prior to that point. In 1934, the South African Party and National Party merged to form the United Party, seeking reconciliation between Afrikaners and English-speaking whites. In 1939, the party split over the entry of the union into World War II as an ally of the United Kingdom, a move which the National Party followers strongly opposed.

Beginning of apartheid 

In 1948, the National Party was elected to power. It strengthened the racial segregation begun under Dutch and British colonial rule. Taking Canada's Indian Act as a framework, the nationalist government classified all peoples into three races (Whites, Blacks, Indians and Coloured people (people of mixed race)) and developed rights and limitations for each. The white minority (less than 20%) controlled the vastly larger black majority. The legally institutionalised segregation became known as apartheid. While whites enjoyed the highest standard of living in all of Africa, comparable to First World Western nations, the black majority remained disadvantaged by almost every standard, including income, education, housing, and life expectancy. The Freedom Charter, adopted in 1955 by the Congress Alliance, demanded a non-racial society and an end to discrimination.

Republic 

On 31 May 1961, the country became a republic following a referendum (only open to white voters) which narrowly passed; the British-dominated Natal province largely voted against the proposal. Elizabeth II lost the title Queen of South Africa, and the last Governor-General, Charles Robberts Swart, became state president. As a concession to the Westminster system, the appointment of the president remained an appointment by parliament and was virtually powerless until P. W. Botha's Constitution Act of 1983, which eliminated the office of prime minister and instated a unique "strong presidency" responsible to parliament. Pressured by other Commonwealth of Nations countries, South Africa withdrew from the organisation in 1961 and rejoined it in 1994.

Despite opposition to apartheid both within and outside the country, the government legislated for a continuation of apartheid. The security forces cracked down on internal dissent, and violence became widespread, with anti-apartheid organisations such as the African National Congress (ANC), the Azanian People's Organisation, and the Pan-Africanist Congress carrying out guerrilla warfare and urban sabotage. The three rival resistance movements also engaged in occasional inter-factional clashes as they jockeyed for domestic influence. Apartheid became increasingly controversial, and several countries began to boycott business with the South African government because of its racial policies. These measures were later extended to international sanctions and the divestment of holdings by foreign investors.

End of apartheid 

The Mahlabatini Declaration of Faith, signed by Mangosuthu Buthelezi and Harry Schwarz in 1974, enshrined the principles of peaceful transition of power and equality for all, the first of such agreements by black and white political leaders in South Africa. Ultimately, F.W. de Klerk opened bilateral discussions with Nelson Mandela in 1993 for a transition of policies and government.

In 1990, the National Party government took the first step towards dismantling discrimination when it lifted the ban on the ANC and other political organisations. It released Nelson Mandela from prison after 27 years of serving a sentence for sabotage. A negotiation process followed. With approval from the white electorate in a 1992 referendum, the government continued negotiations to end apartheid. South Africa held its first universal elections in 1994, which the ANC won by an overwhelming majority. It has been in power ever since. The country rejoined the Commonwealth of Nations and became a member of the Southern African Development Community.

In post-apartheid South Africa, unemployment remained high. While many blacks have risen to middle or upper classes, the overall unemployment rate of black people worsened between 1994 and 2003 by official metrics but declined significantly using expanded definitions. Poverty among whites, which was previously rare, increased. The government struggled to achieve the monetary and fiscal discipline to ensure both redistribution of wealth and economic growth. The United Nations Human Development Index rose steadily until the mid-1990s then fell from 1995 to 2005 before recovering its 1995 peak in 2013. The fall is in large part attributable to the South African HIV/AIDS pandemic which saw South African life expectancy fall from a high point of 62 years in 1992 to a low of 53 in 2005, and the failure of the government to take steps to address the pandemic in its early years.

In May 2008, riots left over 60 people dead. The Centre on Housing Rights and Evictions estimated that over 100,000 people were driven from their homes. The targets were mainly legal and illegal migrants, and refugees seeking asylum, but a third of the victims were South African citizens. In a 2006 survey, the South African Migration Project concluded that South Africans are more opposed to immigration than any other national group. The UN High Commissioner for Refugees in 2008 reported over 200,000 refugees applied for asylum in South Africa, almost four times as many as the year before. These people were mainly from Zimbabwe, though many also come from Burundi, Democratic Republic of the Congo, Rwanda, Eritrea, Ethiopia and Somalia. Competition over jobs, business opportunities, public services and housing has led to tension between refugees and host communities. While xenophobia in South Africa is still a problem, the United Nations High Commissioner for Refugees in 2011 reported that recent violence had not been as widespread as initially feared. Nevertheless, as South Africa continues to grapple with racial issues, one of the proposed solutions has been to pass legislation, such as the pending Hate Crimes and Hate Speech Bill, to uphold South Africa's ban on racism and commitment to equality.

By 2020, numerous warnings have been issued that South Africa is heading towards failed state status  with unsustainable government spending, high unemployment, high crime rates, corruption, failing government owned enterprises and collapsing infrastructure. In 2022, the World Economic Forum said that South Africa risks state collapse and identified five major risks facing the country. The Director-General of the South African Treasury, Dondo Mogajane, has said that, "SA is showing the signs of a failing state more common in countries like Sierra Leone and Liberia". Former minister Jay Naidoo has said that South Africa is in serious trouble and is showing signs of a failed state, with record unemployment levels and the fact that many young people will not find a job in their lifetime. Efficient Group chief economist Dawie Roodt said the country is in deep trouble, "South Africans have been getting poorer for a decade". He said he is very concerned because "32 million people get an income from the state. The state cannot afford this anymore". Neal Froneman, CEO of Sibanye-Stillwater, said that crime is out of control, with 'mafia-style shakedowns' for procurement contracts becoming the norm. "Government leadership has created this problem and they are doing nothing. The government can't deal with it because it goes against their ideology." Professor Eddy Maloka, from the Institute of Risk Management, "The ANC has left us in a mess. They've turned their crisis into ours... Government has collapsed in areas across the country. We are seeing inner-cities collapse and degenerate".  Professor David Himbara said that "South Africa is a classic case of a de facto one-party state with mismanaged institutions and endemic crime and corruption".

Geography 

At , South Africa is the 24th-largest country in the world. This plateau is surrounded by the Great Escarpment whose eastern, and highest, stretch is known as the Drakensberg.

The south and south-western parts of the plateau (at approximately 1,1001,800m above sea level) and the adjoining plain below (at approximately 700800m above sea levelsee map on the right) is known as the Great Karoo, which consists of sparsely populated shrubland. To the north, the Great Karoo fades into the more arid Bushmanland, which eventually becomes the Kalahari Desert in the north-west of the country. The mid-eastern and highest part of the plateau is known as the Highveld. This relatively well-watered area is home to a great proportion of the country's commercial farmlands and contains its largest conurbation (Gauteng). To the north of Highveld, from about the 25°30'S line of latitude, the plateau slopes downwards into the Bushveld, which ultimately gives way to the Limpopo River lowlands or Lowveld.

The coastal belt, below the Great Escarpment, moving clockwise from the northeast, consists of the Limpopo Lowveld, which merges into the Mpumalanga Lowveld, below the Mpumalanga Drakensberg (the eastern portion of the Great Escarpment). This is hotter, drier and less intensely cultivated than the Highveld above the escarpment. The Kruger National Park, located in the provinces of Limpopo and Mpumalanga in north-eastern South Africa, occupies a large portion of the Lowveld covering 19,633 square kilometres (7,580 sq mi) 

The coastal belt below the south and south-western stretches of the Great Escarpment contains several ranges of Cape Fold Mountains which run parallel to the coast, separating the Great Escarpment from the ocean. (These parallel ranges of fold mountains are shown on the map, above left. Note the course of the Great Escarpment to the north of these mountain ranges.) The land between the Outeniqua and Langeberg ranges to the south and the Swartberg range to the north is known as the Little Karoo, which consists of semi-desert shrubland similar to that of the Great Karoo, except that its northern strip along the foothills of the Swartberg Mountains has a somewhat higher rainfall and is, therefore, more cultivated than the Great Karoo. The Little Karoo is famous for its ostrich farming around Oudtshoorn. The lowland area to the north of the Swartberg range up to the Great Escarpment is the lowland part of the Great Karoo, which is climatically and botanically almost indistinguishable from the Karoo above the Great Escarpment. The narrow coastal strip between the Outeniqua and Langeberg ranges and the ocean has a moderately high year-round rainfall, which is known as the Garden Route. It is famous for the most extensive areas of forests in South Africa (a generally forest-poor country).

In the south-west corner of the country, the Cape Peninsula forms the southernmost tip of the coastal strip which borders the Atlantic Ocean and ultimately terminates at the country's border with Namibia at the Orange River. The Cape Peninsula has a Mediterranean climate, making it and its immediate surrounds the only portion of Sub-Saharan Africa which receives most of its rainfall in winter. The coastal belt to the north of the Cape Peninsula is bounded on the west by the Atlantic Ocean and the first row of north–south running Cape Fold Mountains to the east. The Cape Fold Mountains peter out at about the 32°S line of latitude, after which the Great Escarpment bounds the coastal plain. The most southerly portion of this coastal belt is known as the Swartland and Malmesbury Plain, which is an important wheat growing region, relying on winter rains. The region further north is known as Namaqualand, which becomes more arid near the Orange River. The little rain that falls tends to fall in winter, which results in one of the world's most spectacular displays of flowers carpeting huge stretches of veld in spring (AugustSeptember).

South Africa also has one offshore possession, the small sub-Antarctic archipelago of the Prince Edward Islands, consisting of Marion Island and Prince Edward Island (not to be confused with the Canadian province of the same name).

Climate 

South Africa has a generally temperate climate because it is surrounded by the Atlantic and Indian Oceans on three sides, because it is located in the climatically milder Southern Hemisphere, and because its average elevation rises steadily toward the north (toward the equator) and further inland. This varied topography and oceanic influence result in a great variety of climatic zones. The climatic zones range from the extreme desert of the southern Namib in the farthest northwest to the lush subtropical climate in the east along the border with Mozambique and the Indian Ocean. Winters in South Africa occur between June and August. The extreme southwest has a climate similar to that of the Mediterranean with wet winters and hot, dry summers, hosting the famous fynbos biome of shrubland and thicket. This area produces much of the wine in South Africa and is known for its wind, which blows intermittently almost all year. The severity of this wind made passing around the Cape of Good Hope is particularly treacherous for sailors, causing many shipwrecks. Further east on the south coast, rainfall is distributed more evenly throughout the year, producing a green landscape. The annual rainfall increases south of the Lowveld, especially near the coast, which is subtropical. The Free State is particularly flat because it lies centrally on the high plateau. North of the Vaal River, the Highveld becomes better watered and does not experience subtropical extremes of heat. Winters in this region are cold, although snow is rare.

The Prince Edward Islands have colder average annual temperatures, but Buffelsfontein has colder extremes.

Climate change in South Africa is leading to increased temperatures and rainfall variability. Extreme weather events are becoming more prominent. This is a critical concern for South Africans as climate change will affect the overall status and wellbeing of the country, for example with regards to water resources. Speedy environmental changes are resulting in clear effects on the community and environmental level in different ways and aspects, starting with air quality, to temperature and weather patterns, reaching out to food security and disease burden. South Africa contributes considerable carbon dioxide emissions, being the 14th largest emitter of carbon dioxide, primarily from its heavy reliance on coal and oil for energy production. As part of its international commitments, South Africa has pledged to peak emissions between 2020 and 2025.

Biodiversity 
 

South Africa signed the Rio Convention on Biological Diversity on 4 June 1994 and became a party to the convention on 2 November 1995. It has subsequently produced a National Biodiversity Strategy and Action Plan, which was received by the convention on 7 June 2006. The country is ranked sixth out of the world's seventeen megadiverse countries. Ecotourism in South Africa has become more prevalent in recent years, as a possible method of maintaining and improving biodiversity.

Numerous mammals are found in the Bushveld including lions, African leopards, South African cheetahs, southern white rhinos, blue wildebeest, kudus, impalas, hyenas, hippopotamuses and South African giraffes. A significant extent of the Bushveld exists in the north-east including Kruger National Park and the Sabi Sand Game Reserve, as well as in the far north in the Waterberg Biosphere. South Africa houses many endemic species, among them the critically endangered riverine rabbit (Bunolagus monticullaris) in the Karoo.

Up to 1945, more than 4,900 species of fungi (including lichen-forming species) had been recorded. In 2006, the number of fungi in South Africa was estimated at 200,000 species but did not take into account fungi associated with insects. If correct, then the number of South African fungi dwarfs that of its plants. In at least some major South African ecosystems, an exceptionally high percentage of fungi are highly specific in terms of the plants with which they occur. The country's Biodiversity Strategy and Action Plan does not mention fungi (including lichen-forming fungi).

With more than 22,000 different vascular plants, or about 9% of all the known species of plants on Earth, South Africa is particularly rich in plant diversity. The most prevalent biome is the grassland, particularly on the Highveld, where the plant cover is dominated by different grasses, low shrubs, and acacia, mainly camel-thorn (Vachellia erioloba). Vegetation is sparse towards the north-west because of low rainfall. There are numerous species of water-storing succulents, like aloes and euphorbias, in the very hot and dry Namaqualand area. And according to the World Wildlife Fund, South Africa is home to around a third of all succulent species. The grass and thorn savanna turns slowly into a bush savanna towards the north-east of the country, with denser growth. There are significant numbers of baobab trees in this area, near the northern end of Kruger National Park.

The fynbos biome, which makes up the majority of the area and plant life in the Cape Floristic Region, is located in a small region of the Western Cape and contains more than 9,000 of those species, or three times more plant species than found in the Amazon rainforest, making it among the richest regions on earth in terms of plant diversity. Most of the plants are evergreen hard-leaf plants with fine, needle-like leaves, such as the sclerophyllous plants. Another uniquely South African flowering plant group is the genus Protea, with around 130 different species. While South Africa has a great wealth of flowering plants, only 1% of the land is forest, almost exclusively in the humid coastal plain of KwaZulu-Natal, where there are also areas of Southern Africa mangroves in river mouths. Even smaller reserves of forests are out of the reach of fire, known as montane forests. Plantations of imported tree species are predominant, particularly the non-native eucalyptus and pine.

Conservation issues 

South Africa has lost a large area of natural habitat in the last four decades, primarily because of overpopulation, sprawling development patterns, and deforestation during the 19th century. The country had a 2019 Forest Landscape Integrity Index mean score of 4.94/10, ranking it 112th globally out of 172 countries. South Africa is one of the worst affected countries in the world when it comes to invasion by alien species with many (e.g., black wattle, Port Jackson willow, Hakea, Lantana and Jacaranda) posing a significant threat to the native biodiversity and the already scarce water resources. The original temperate forest found by the first European settlers was exploited until only small patches remained. Currently, South African hardwood trees like real yellowwood (Podocarpus latifolius), stinkwood (Ocotea bullata), and South African black ironwood (Olea capensis) are under strict government protection. Statistics from the Department of Environmental Affairs show a record 1,215 rhinos were killed in 2014. Since South Africa is home to a third of all succulent species (many endemic to the Karoo), it makes it a hotspot for plant poaching, leading to many species to be threatened with extinction.

Climate change is expected to bring considerable warming and drying to much of this already semi-arid region, with greater frequency and intensity of extreme weather events such as heat waves, flooding and drought. The Cape Floral Region is predicted to be hit very hard by climate change. Drought, increased intensity and frequency of fire, and climbing temperatures are expected to push many rare species towards extinction. South Africa has published two national climate change reports in 2011 and 2016.

Demographics

South Africa is a nation of about 60 million (as of 2021) people of diverse origins, cultures, languages, and religions. The last census was held in 2011, with estimates produced on an annual basis. South Africa is home to an estimated five million illegal immigrants, including some three million Zimbabweans. A series of anti-immigrant riots occurred beginning in May 2008.

Statistics South Africa asks people to describe themselves in the census in terms of five racial population groups. The 2011 census figures for these groups were: Black African at 79.2%, White at 8.9%, Coloured at 8.9%, Indian or Asian at 2.5%, and Other/Unspecified at 0.5%. The first census in 1911 showed that whites made up 22% of the population; this had declined to 16% by 1980.

South Africa hosts a sizeable refugee and asylum seeker population. According to the World Refugee Survey 2008, published by the U.S. Committee for Refugees and Immigrants, this population numbered approximately 144,700 in 2007. Groups of refugees and asylum seekers numbering over 10,000 included people from Zimbabwe (48,400), the DRC (24,800), and Somalia (12,900). These populations mainly lived in Johannesburg, Pretoria, Durban, Cape Town, and Port Elizabeth.

Languages 

South Africa has 11 official languages: Zulu, Xhosa, Afrikaans, English, Pedi, Tswana, Southern Sotho, Tsonga, Swazi, Venda, and Southern Ndebele (in order of first language speakers). In this regard it is fourth only to Bolivia, India, and Zimbabwe in number. While all the languages are formally equal, some languages are spoken more than others. According to the 2011 census, the three most spoken first languages are Zulu (22.7%), Xhosa (16.0%), and Afrikaans (13.5%). Although English is recognised as the language of commerce and science, it is only the fourth most common home language, that of only 9.6% of South Africans in 2011; nevertheless, it has become the de facto lingua franca of the nation. Estimates based on the 1991 census suggest just under half of South Africans can speak English. It is the second most commonly spoken language outside of the household, after Zulu.

The country also recognises several unofficial languages, including Fanagalo, Khoe, Lobedu, Nama, Northern Ndebele, Phuthi, and South African Sign Language. These unofficial languages may be used in certain official uses in limited areas where it has been determined that these languages are prevalent. Many of the unofficial languages of the San and Khoekhoe peoples contain regional dialects stretching northwards into Namibia and Botswana, and elsewhere. These people, who are a physically distinct population from the Bantu people who make up most of the Black Africans in South Africa, have their own cultural identity based on their hunter-gatherer societies. They have been marginalised to a great extent, and the remainder of their languages are in danger of becoming extinct.

White South Africans may also speak European languages, including Italian, Portuguese (also spoken by black Angolans and Mozambicans), Dutch, German, and Greek, while some Indian South Africans speak Indian languages, such as Gujarati, Hindi, Tamil, Telugu, and Urdu. French is spoken by migrants from Francophone Africa.

Religion 

According to the 2001 census, Christians accounted for 79.8% of the population, with a majority of them being members of various Protestant denominations (broadly defined to include syncretic African-initiated churches) and a minority of Roman Catholics and other Christians. Christian category includes Zion Christian (11.1%), Pentecostal (Charismatic) (8.2%), Roman Catholic (7.1%), Methodist (6.8%), Dutch Reformed (6.7%), and Anglican (3.8%). Members of remaining Christian churches accounted for another 36% of the population. Muslims accounted for 1.5% of the population, Hindus 1.2%, traditional African religions 0.3% and Judaism 0.2%. 15.1% had no religious affiliation, 0.6% were "other" and 1.4% were "unspecified."

African-initiated churches formed the largest of the Christian groups. It was believed that many of the persons who claimed no affiliation with any organised religion adhered to a traditional African religion. Many peoples have syncretic religious practices combining Christian and indigenous influences.

South African Muslims comprise mainly Coloureds and Indians. They have been joined by black or white South African converts as well as those from other parts of Africa. South African Muslims describe their faith as the fastest-growing religion of conversion in the country, with the number of black Muslims growing sixfold, from 12,000 in 1991 to 74,700 in 2004.

There is a substantial Jewish population, descended from European Jews who arrived as a minority among other European settlers. This population peaked in the 1970s at 120,000, though only around 67,000 remain today, the rest having emigrated, mostly to Israel. Even so, these numbers make the Jewish community in South Africa the twelfth largest in the world.

Education 

The adult literacy rate in 2007 was 88.7%. South Africa has a three-tier system of education starting with primary school, followed by high school, and tertiary education in the form of (academic) universities and universities of technology. Learners have twelve years of formal schooling, from grade 1 to 12. Grade R, or grade 0, is a pre-primary foundation year. Primary schools span the first seven years of schooling. High school education spans a further five years. The National Senior Certificate examination takes place at the end of grade 12 and is necessary for tertiary studies at a South African university. Public universities are divided into three types: traditional universities, which offer theoretically oriented university degrees; universities of technology (formerly called technikons), which offer vocationally-oriented diplomas and degrees; and comprehensive universities, which offer both types of qualification. There are 23 public universities in South Africa: 11 traditional universities, 6 universities of technology, and 6 comprehensive universities.

Under apartheid, schools for black people were subject to discrimination through inadequate funding and a separate syllabus called Bantu Education which only taught skills sufficient to work as labourers.

In 2004, South Africa started reforming its tertiary education system, merging and incorporating small universities into larger institutions, and renaming all tertiary education institutions "university". By 2015, 1.4 million students in higher education have benefited from a financial aid scheme which was promulgated in 1999.

Health 

According to the South African Institute of Race Relations, the life expectancy in 2009 was 71 years for a white South African and 48 years for a black South African. The healthcare spending in the country is about 9% of GDP. About 84% of the population depends on the public healthcare system, which is beset with chronic human resource shortages and limited resources. About 20% of the population use private healthcare. Only 16% of the population are covered by medical aid schemes; the rest pay for private care out-of-pocket or through in-hospital-only plans. The three dominant hospital groups, Mediclinic, Life Healthcare and Netcare, together control 75% of the private hospital market.

HIV/AIDS 

According to the 2015 UNAIDS medical report, South Africa has an estimated seven million people that are living with HIV – more than any other country in the world. In 2018, HIV prevalence—the percentage of people living with HIV—among adults (15–49 years) was 20.4%, and in the same year 71,000 people died from an AIDS-related illness.

A 2008 study revealed that HIV/AIDS infection is distinctly divided along racial lines: 13.6% of blacks are HIV-positive, whereas only 0.3% of whites have the virus. Most deaths are experienced by economically active individuals, resulting in many AIDS orphans who in many cases depend on the state for care and financial support. It is estimated that there are 1,200,000 orphans in South Africa.

The link between HIV, a virus spread primarily by sexual contact, and AIDS was long denied by President Thabo Mbeki and his health minister Manto Tshabalala-Msimang, who insisted that the many deaths in the country are caused by malnutrition, and hence poverty, and not HIV. In 2007, in response to international pressure, the government made efforts to fight AIDS. After the 2009 general elections, President Jacob Zuma appointed Aaron Motsoaledi as the health minister and committed his government to increasing funding for and widening the scope of HIV treatment, and by 2015, South Africa had made significant progress, with the widespread availability of antiretroviral drugs resulted in an increase in life expectancy from 52.1 years to 62.5 years.

Urbanization 
One online database lists South Africa having more than 12,600 cities and towns. The following are the largest cities and towns in South Africa.

Government and politics 

South Africa is a parliamentary republic, but unlike most such republics, the president is both head of state and head of government and depends for his tenure on the confidence of Parliament. The executive, legislature and judiciary are all subject to the supremacy of the Constitution of South Africa, and the superior courts have the power to strike down executive actions and acts of Parliament if they are unconstitutional. The National Assembly, the lower house of Parliament, consists of 400 members and is elected every five years by a system of party-list proportional representation. The National Council of Provinces, the upper house, consists of ninety members, with each of the nine provincial legislatures electing ten members.

After each parliamentary election, the National Assembly elects one of its members as president; hence the president serves a term of office the same as that of the Assembly, normally five years. No president may serve more than two terms in office. The president appoints a deputy president and ministers (each representing a department) who form the cabinet. The National Assembly may remove the president and the cabinet by a motion of no confidence. In the most recent election, held on 8 May 2019, the ANC won 58% of the vote and 230 seats, while the main opposition, the Democratic Alliance, won 21% of the vote and 84 seats. The Economic Freedom Fighters, founded by Julius Malema, former president of the ANC Youth League who was later expelled from the ANC, won 11% of the vote and 44 seats. The ANC has been the governing political party in South Africa since the end of apartheid.

South Africa has no legally defined capital city. The fourth chapter of the constitution states "The seat of Parliament is Cape Town, but an Act of Parliament enacted in accordance with section 76(1) and (5) may determine that the seat of Parliament is elsewhere." The country's three branches of government are split over different cities. Cape Town, as the seat of Parliament, is the legislative capital; Pretoria, as the seat of the president and cabinet, is the administrative capital; and Bloemfontein is the seat of the Supreme Court of Appeal, is the judicial capital; while the Constitutional Court of South Africa sits in Johannesburg. Most foreign embassies are located in Pretoria.

Since 2004, South Africa has had many thousands of popular protests, some violent, making it, according to one academic, the "most protest-rich country in the world". There have been numerous incidents of political repression as well as threats of future repression in violation of the constitution, leading some analysts and civil society organisations to conclude that there is or could be a new climate of political repression.

In 2008, South Africa placed fifth out of 48 sub-Saharan African countries on the Ibrahim Index of African Governance. South Africa scored well in the categories of Rule of Law, Transparency and Corruption, and Participation and Human Rights, but score low in Safety and Security. In 2006, South Africa became the first and only African country to legalise same-sex marriage.

The Constitution of South Africa is the supreme rule of law in the country. The primary sources of South African law are Roman-Dutch mercantile law and personal law and English Common law, as imports of Dutch settlements and British colonialism. The first European-based law in South Africa was brought by the Dutch East India Company and is called Roman-Dutch law. It was imported before the codification of European law into the Napoleonic Code and is comparable in many ways to Scots law. This was followed in the 19th century by English law, both common and statutory. After unification in 1910, South Africa had its own parliament which passed laws specific for South Africa, building on those previously passed for the individual member colonies. The judicial system consists of the magistrates' courts, which hear lesser criminal cases and smaller civil cases; the High Court, which has divisions that serve as the courts of general jurisdiction for specific areas; the Supreme Court of Appeal; and the Constitutional Court, which is the highest court.

Foreign relations 

As the Union of South Africa, the country was a founding member of the United Nations (UN), with Prime Minister Jan Smuts writing the preamble to the UN Charter. South Africa is one of the founding members of the African Union (AU) and has the third largest economy of all the members. It is a founding member of the AU's New Partnership for Africa's Development. After apartheid ended, South Africa was readmitted to the Commonwealth of Nations. The country is a member of the Group of 77 and chaired the organisation in 2006. South Africa is also a member of the Southern African Development Community, South Atlantic Peace and Cooperation Zone, Southern African Customs Union, Antarctic Treaty System, World Trade Organization, International Monetary Fund, G20, G8+5, and the Port Management Association of Eastern and Southern Africa.

South Africa has played a key role as a mediator in African conflicts over the last decade, such as in Burundi, the Democratic Republic of the Congo, Comoros, and Zimbabwe.

President Jacob Zuma and Chinese President Hu Jintao upgraded bilateral ties between the two countries in 2010 when they signed the Beijing Agreement which elevated South Africa's earlier "strategic partnership" with China to the higher level of "comprehensive strategic partnership" in both economic and political affairs, including the strengthening of exchanges between their respective ruling parties and legislatures. In 2011, South Africa joined the Brazil-Russia-India-China (BRICS) grouping of countries, identified by Zuma as the country's largest trading partners and also the largest trading partners with Africa as a whole. Zuma asserted that BRICS member countries would also work with each other through the UN, G20, and the India, Brazil South Africa (IBSA) forum.

Military 

The South African National Defence Force (SANDF) was created in 1994 as a volunteer military composed of the former South African Defence Force, the forces of the African nationalist groups ( and Azanian People's Liberation Army), and the former Bantustan defence forces. The SANDF is subdivided into four branches, the South African Army, the South African Air Force, the South African Navy, and the South African Military Health Service. In recent years, the SANDF has become a major peacekeeping force in Africa, and has been involved in operations in Lesotho, the DRC, and Burundi, amongst others. It has also served in multinational UN Peacekeeping forces such as the UN Force Intervention Brigade.

In 1998 a major defence procurement programme was undertaken to re-equip the South African armed forces for the post-apartheid era also known as the ″South African Arms Deal″ the country had spent $4.8 billion on acquiring 26 Gripen multi-role fighters, 24 BAE Hawks, 30 A109s, 4 Valour-class frigates and 3 Heroine-class submarines.

Armaments Corporation of South Africa (Armscor) is the arms procurement agency of the South African Department of Defence. As of today the South African military industry is considered one of the most advanced in the non western world. The country produces military equipment such as the Ratel IFV which is the world's first wheeled IFV to enter service worldwide, the country also developed the Denel Rooivalk attack helicopter which is considered one of the worlds most powerful attack helicopters. During the 1980s after developing the Atlas Cheetah fighter aircraft South Africa started development of a Fourth-generation fighter aircraft known as the ″Atlas Carver″ the country had spent more than $2 billion on this project but it was cancelled in 1991 due to the end of the Cold War as the country no longer faced external military threats.

The SANDF has recently been deployed to counter gang violence in the Cape Flats and during the COVID-19 pandemic. During the 2021 South African unrest one of the largest deployments of soldiers since the end of Apartheid, 25,000 South African troops were deployed to the Gauteng and KwaZulu-Natal provinces to assist the South African Police quell the riots. In a show of strength, a convoy of more than a dozen armored personnel carriers brought soldiers into South Africa’s most populous province Gauteng, which includes the largest city Johannesburg, and the Executive Capital of South Africa Pretoria. The largest deployment of soldiers since South Africa won democracy in 1994 was in March 2020, when 70,000 army troops were sent out to enforce the country's strict lockdown to combat the spread of COVID-19.

Nuclear weapons 

South Africa is the only African country to have successfully developed nuclear weapons. It became the first country (followed by Ukraine) with nuclear capability to voluntarily renounce and dismantle its programme and in the process signed the Nuclear Non-Proliferation Treaty in 1991. South Africa undertook a nuclear weapons programme in the 1970s. According to President F.W. de Klerk, the decision to build a "nuclear deterrent" was taken "as early as 1974 against a backdrop of a Soviet expansionist threat." South Africa is alleged to have conducted a nuclear test over the Atlantic in 1979, although this is officially denied; de Klerk maintained that South Africa had "never conducted a clandestine nuclear test." Six nuclear devices were completed between 1980 and 1990 but all were dismantled by 1991.

In 1990, the apartheid government extracted the country’s inventory of highly enriched uranium from its nuclear weapons, then melted the fuel before storing it in a silver vault at the Pelindaba nuclear research center which is located in the country’s administrative capital Pretoria. In 2011 South African president Jacob Zuma had rejected an offer from the Obama administration to get rid of his country’s nuclear-weapons fuel. Obama warned Zuma that a terrorist nuclear attack would constitute a "global catastrophe." In 2017, South Africa signed the UN treaty on the Prohibition of Nuclear Weapons.

Law enforcement and crime 

Law enforcement in South Africa is primarily the responsibility of the South African Police Service (SAPS), South Africa's national police force. SAPS is responsible for investigating crime and security throughout the country. The South African Police Service has over 1,154 police stations across the country and over 150,950 officers. In 2023 the Special Task Force (SAPS) placed 9th at the international SWAT competition out of 55 law enforcement teams from across the world making it the best in Africa.

From April 2017 to March 2018, on average 57 murders were committed each day in South Africa. In the year ended March 2017, there were 20,336 murders and the murder rate was 35.9 per 100,000 – over five times higher than the global average of 6.2 per 100,000. More than 526,000 South Africans were murdered from 1994 to 2019. Middle-class South Africans seek security in gated communities.  Many emigrants from South Africa state that crime was a major factor in their decision to leave. Crime against the farming community has continued to be a major problem. In an attempt to reduce crime rate, the police arrested over 500 undocumented foreigners in a raid in August 2019. South Africa has a high rape rate, with 43,195 rapes reported in 2014/15, and an unknown number of sexual assaults going unreported. A 2009 survey of 1,738 men in KwaZulu-Natal and the Eastern Cape by the Medical Research Council found one in four men admitted to raping someone, and another survey of 4,000 women in Johannesburg by CIET Africa found one in three said they had been raped in the past year. Rape occurs most commonly within relationships, but many men and women say that rape cannot occur in relationships; however, one in four women reported having been abused by an intimate partner. Rapes are also perpetrated by children (some as young as ten). The incidence of child and infant rape is among the highest in the world, largely as a result of the virgin cleansing myth, and a number of high-profile cases (sometimes as young as eight months) have outraged the nation.

Between 1994 and 2018, there were more than 500 xenophobic attacks against foreigners in South Africa. The 2019 Johannesburg riots were similar in nature and origin to the 2008 xenophobic riots that also occurred in Johannesburg.

Administrative divisions 

Each of the nine provinces is governed by a unicameral legislature, which is elected every five years by party-list proportional representation. The legislature elects a premier as head of government, and the premier appoints an Executive Council as a provincial cabinet. The powers of provincial governments are limited to topics listed in the constitution; these topics include such fields as health, education, public housing and transport.

The provinces are in turn divided into 52 districts: 8 metropolitan and 44 district municipalities. The district municipalities are further subdivided into 205 local municipalities. The metropolitan municipalities, which govern the largest urban agglomerations, perform the functions of both district and local municipalities.

Economy 

South Africa has a mixed economy, the third largest in Africa, after Nigeria and Egypt and the 39th largest in the world. It also has a relatively high gross domestic product (GDP) per capita compared to other countries in sub-Saharan Africa US$16,040 at purchasing power parity as of 2023 ranked 95th. Despite this, South Africa is still burdened by a relatively high rate of poverty and unemployment and is ranked in the top ten countries in the world for income inequality, measured by the Gini coefficient. 

South Africa is ranked 40th by total Wealth, making it the second wealthiest country in Africa, and in terms of private wealth South Africa has a private wealth of $651 billion making it the wealthiest country in Africa by private wealth followed by Egypt with $307 billion and Nigeria with $228 billion.

Approximately 55.5% (30.3 million people) of the population is living in poverty at the national upper poverty line while a total of 13.8 million people (25% of the population) are experiencing food poverty.

In 2015, 71% of net wealth are held by 10% of the population, whereas 60% of the population held only 7% of the net wealth, and the Gini coefficient was 0.63, whereas in 1996 it was 0.61.

Unlike most of the world's poor countries, South Africa does not have a thriving informal economy. Only 15% of South African jobs are in the informal sector, compared with around half in Brazil and India and nearly three-quarters in Indonesia. The Organisation for Economic Co-operation and Development (OECD) attributes this difference to South Africa's widespread welfare system. World Bank research shows that South Africa has one of the widest gaps between per capita GDP versus its Human Development Index ranking, with only Botswana showing a larger gap.

After 1994, government policy brought down inflation, stabilised public finances, and some foreign capital was attracted, however growth was still subpar. From 2004 onward, economic growth picked up significantly; both employment and capital formation increased. During the presidency of Jacob Zuma, the government increased the role of state-owned enterprises (SOEs). Some of the biggest SOEs are Eskom, the electric power monopoly, South African Airways (SAA), and Transnet, the railroad and ports monopoly. Some of these SOEs have not been profitable, such as SAA, which has required bailouts totaling R30 billion ($ billion) over the 20 years preceding 2015.

Principal international trading partners of South Africa—besides other African countries—include Germany, the United States, China, Japan, the United Kingdom and Spain. The 2020 Financial Secrecy Index ranked South Africa as the 58th safest tax haven in the world.

The South African agricultural industry contributes around 10% of formal employment, relatively low compared to other parts of Africa, as well as providing work for casual labourers and contributing around 2.6% of GDP for the nation. Due to the aridity of the land, only 13.5% can be used for crop production, and only 3% is considered high potential land.

In August 2013, South Africa was ranked as the top African Country of the Future by fDi Intelligence based on the country's economic potential, labour environment, cost-effectiveness, infrastructure, business friendliness, and foreign direct investment strategy.

Mining

South Africa has always been a mining powerhouse. In 2006 South Africa was the world’s largest gold producer for almost a century, by the end of 2009 gold mining in South Africa had declined rapidly having produced 205 metric tons (mt) of gold in 2008 compared to 1,000 metric tons produced in 1970 (almost 80% of the world’s mine supply at the time). Despite this, the country still has 6,000 tonnes of gold reserves and is still number 5 in gold production and remains a cornucopia of mineral riches. It is the world's largest producer of chrome, manganese, platinum, vanadium and vermiculite. It is the second largest producer of ilmenite, palladium, rutile and zirconium. It is the world's third largest coal exporter. It is a huge producer of iron ore; in 2012, it overtook India to become the world's third-biggest iron ore supplier to China, the world's largest consumers of iron ore.

Labour market 

From 1995 to 2003, the number of formal jobs decreased and informal jobs increased; overall unemployment worsened. According to data published by the University of Cape Town, between 2017 and the end of 2020, South Africa had lost 56% of its middle-class earners, and the number of ultra-poor who earn below minimum wage had increased by 6.6 million individuals (54%).

The government's Black Economic Empowerment policies have drawn criticism from Neva Makgetla, previous lead economist for research and information at the Development Bank of Southern Africa, for focusing "almost exclusively on promoting individual ownership by black people [which] does little to address broader economic disparities, though the rich may become more diverse." Official affirmative action policies have seen a rise in black economic wealth and an emerging black middle class. Other problems include state ownership and interference, which impose high barriers to entry in many areas. Restrictive labour regulations have contributed to the unemployment malaise.

Along with many African nations, South Africa has been experiencing a brain drain in the past 20 years and is almost certainly detrimental for the wellbeing of those reliant on the healthcare infrastructure. The skills drain in South Africa tends to demonstrate racial contours given the skills distribution legacy of South Africa and has thus resulted in large white South African communities abroad. However, the statistics which purport to show a brain drain are disputed and also do not account for repatriation and expiry of foreign work contracts. According to several surveys, there was a reverse in brain drain following the global financial crisis of 2007–2008 and expiration of foreign work contracts. In the first quarter of 2011, confidence levels for graduate professionals were recorded at a level of 84% in a Professional Provident Society survey. Illegal immigrants are involved in informal trading. Many immigrants to South Africa continue to live in poor conditions, and the immigration policy has become increasingly restrictive since 1994.

Human Rights Watch reported in August 2019 that foreign national truck drivers were being subjected to deadly attacks carried out by South African truck drivers. The organization urged the South African government to take immediate actions ensuring the safety of the foreign national truck drivers putting up with violence, harassment, intimidation, stoning, bombing, and shooting, by local truck drivers in the country.

Tourism

Infrastructure

Roads 

South Africa has a total road network of 750 000 kilometres which makes it the largest road network in Africa and the 10th largest in the world. According to SANRAL, the road network is valued at more than R2.1 trillion. SANRAL manages national roads and has a network of 22 197 kilometres of paved roads. Provinces are responsible for 222 951 kilometres while, according to the DoT, the municipal network is estimated at 275 661 kilometres of the proclaimed network. The rest are unproclaimed gravel roads (mainly serving rural communities) and are therefore not owned or maintained by any road authority. The country has more than 12 million motor vehicles with an average density of 16 motor vehicles per kilometre. The provincial road network is about 222 951 kilometres in length, consisting of 170 837 kilometres of unpaved and 52 114 kilometres of paved roads.

Rail 

Rail transport in South Africa is an important element of the country's transport infrastructure. All major cities are connected by rail. Transnet Freight Rail mainly operates freight services while PRASA operates commuter services. State-owned utility Transnet Freight Rail is the largest freight rail transport operator on the African continent, the company maintains a rail network of approximately 31,000 km but only 20,900 km of this are in use. 

South Africa's railway system is the most developed and largest in Africa as well as the 13th largest in the world, However, freight, passenger and port capacity shortages remain a severe constraint in domestic and regional trade.

Coal and iron ore are mainly transported on these lines, the country's rail network carried nearly 230 million tons of freight in 2017 this has declined to 179 million tons in 2021.

Energy 

South Africa has a very large energy sector and is currently the only country on the African continent that possesses a Nuclear power plant. The country ranks as the largest producer of electricity on the African continent and it ranks 21st globally. South Africa also ranks as the 7th largest coal producer in the world and produces in excess of 248 million tonnes of coal and consumes almost three-quarters of that domestically. Around 77% of South Africa's energy needs are directly derived from coal and 92% of coal consumed on the African continent is mined in South Africa. South Africa is also the world's 14th largest emitter of greenhouse gases. Power stations in South Africa include: Koeberg, Kendal, Kriel, Camden, Tutuka, Majuba, Grootvlei, Arnot, Hendrina, Lethabo, Matimba, Matla, Kusile and Medupi.
Despite being the largest electricity producer on the continent, the country still faces an energy crisis which causes a drastic effect on the country's economy and infrastructure, most notability manifesting in the form of successive rounds of loadshedding.Loadshedding is an ongoing period of widespread national level rolling blackouts that is being implemented by the national utility Eskom in order to prevent a total grid collapse, this is mainly due to Eskom not being able to keep up with electricity demand as its ageing coal power-station fleet breaks down often as well as crime and corruption.

As a response 2 new power plants are being built known as the Kusile Power Station and Medupi Power Station's which together will be the among the largest coal-fired power stations and the largest dry-cooled power stations in the world expected to be completed by 2023-2026.

Between December 2022 and February 2023 around 2700 South African National Defence Force troops were deployed to Eskom power stations throughout the country to counter theft and sabotage. In February 2023 South African President Cyril Ramaphosa declared a state of disaster over the energy crisis as it has escalated in recent months with South Africans facing power cuts for 288 days in 2022 while in 2023 there have been power cuts for up to 15 hours a day.

Science and technology 

Several important scientific and technological developments have originated in South Africa. South Africa was ranked 61st in the Global Innovation Index in 2021, up from 63rd in 2019. The first human-to-human heart transplant was performed by cardiac surgeon Christiaan Barnard at Groote Schuur Hospital in December 1967; Max Theiler developed a vaccine against yellow fever, Allan MacLeod Cormack pioneered X-ray computed tomography (CT scan); and Aaron Klug developed crystallographic electron microscopy techniques. Cormack and Klug received Nobel Prizes for their work. Sydney Brenner won most recently, in 2002, for his pioneering work in molecular biology.

Mark Shuttleworth founded an early Internet security company Thawte, that was subsequently bought out by world leader Verisign. It is the expressed objective of the government to transition the economy to be more reliant on high technology, based on the realisation that South Africa cannot compete with Far Eastern economies in manufacturing, nor can the republic rely on its mineral wealth in perpetuity.

South Africa has cultivated a burgeoning astronomy community. It hosts the Southern African Large Telescope, the largest optical telescope in the Southern Hemisphere. South Africa is currently building the Karoo Array Telescope as a pathfinder for the €1.5 billion Square Kilometre Array project.

Transport

Modes of transport include roads, railways, airports, water, and pipelines for petroleum oil. The majority of people in South Africa use informal minibus taxis as their main mode of transport. Bus rapid transit has been implemented in some cities in an attempt to provide more formalised and safer public transport services. These systems have been widely criticised because of their large capital and operating costs. South Africa has many major ports including Cape Town, Durban, and Port Elizabeth that allow ships and other boats to pass through, some carrying passengers and some carrying petroleum tankers.

Water supply and sanitation 

Two distinctive features of the South African water sector are the policy of free basic water and the existence of water boards, which are bulk water supply agencies that operate pipelines and sell water from reservoirs to municipalities. These features have led to significant problems concerning the financial sustainability of service providers, leading to a lack of attention to maintenance. Following the end of apartheid, the country had made improvements in the levels of access to water as those with access increased from 66% to 79% from 1990 to 2010. Sanitation access increased from 71% to 79% during the same period. However, water supply and sanitation has come under increasing pressure in recent years despite a commitment made by the government to improve service standards and provide investment subsidies to the water industry.

The eastern parts of South Africa suffer from periodic droughts linked to the El Niño weather phenomenon. In early 2018, Cape Town, which has different weather patterns to the rest of the country, faced a water crisis as the city's water supply was predicted to run dry before the end of June. Cape Town rejected an offer from Israel to help it build desalination plants.

Culture 

The South African black majority still has a substantial number of rural inhabitants who lead largely impoverished lives. It is among these people that cultural traditions survive most strongly; as blacks have become increasingly urbanised and Westernised, aspects of traditional culture have declined. Members of the middle class, who are predominantly white but whose ranks include growing numbers of Black, Coloured and Indian people, have lifestyles similar in many respects to that of people found in Western Europe, North America and Australasia.

Arts 

South African art includes the oldest art objects in the world, which were discovered in a South African cave and dated from roughly 75,000 years ago. The scattered tribes of the Khoisan peoples moving into South Africa from around 10,000 BC had their own fluent art styles seen today in a multitude of cave paintings. They were superseded by the Bantu/Nguni peoples with their own vocabularies of art forms. Forms of art evolved in the mines and townships: a dynamic art using everything from plastic strips to bicycle spokes. The Dutch-influenced folk art of the Afrikaner  and the urban white artists, earnestly following changing European traditions from the 1850s onwards, also contributed to this eclectic mix which continues to evolve to this day.

Popular culture 

The South African media sector is large, and South Africa is one of Africa's major media centres. While the many broadcasters and publications reflect the diversity of the population as a whole, the most commonly used language is English. However, all ten other official languages are represented to some extent or another.

There is great diversity in South African music. Black musicians have developed unique styles called Kwaito and Amapiano, that is said to have taken over radio, television, and magazines. Of note is Brenda Fassie, who launched to fame with her song "Weekend Special", which was sung in English. More famous traditional musicians include Ladysmith Black Mambazo, while the Soweto String Quartet performs classical music with an African flavour. South Africa has produced world-famous jazz musicians, notably Hugh Masekela, Jonas Gwangwa, Abdullah Ibrahim, Miriam Makeba, Jonathan Butler, Chris McGregor, and Sathima Bea Benjamin. Afrikaans music covers multiple genres, such as the contemporary Steve Hofmeyr, the punk rock band Fokofpolisiekar, and the singer-songwriter Jeremy Loops. South African popular musicians that have found international success include  Manfred Mann, Johnny Clegg, rap-rave duo Die Antwoord, rock band Seether and rappers such as AKA, Nasty C and Cassper Nyovest gained notoriety in other avenues like the BET Awards for best African acts.

Although few South African film productions are known outside South Africa, many foreign films have been produced about South Africa. Arguably, the most high-profile film portraying South Africa in recent years was District 9 and its upcoming sequel. In 2015, the Oliver Hermanus film The Endless River became the first South African film selected for the Venice Film Festival.

Literature 

South African literature emerged from a unique social and political history. One of the first well known novels written by a black author in an African language was Solomon Thekiso Plaatje's Mhudi, written in 1930. During the 1950s, Drum magazine became a hotbed of political satire, fiction, and essays, giving a voice to the urban black culture. 

Notable white South African authors include Alan Paton, who published the novel Cry, the Beloved Country in 1948. Nadine Gordimer became the first South African to be awarded the Nobel Prize in Literature, in 1991. J.M. Coetzee won the Nobel Prize in Literature in 2003. When awarding the prize, the Swedish Academy stated that Coetzee "in innumerable guises portrays the surprising involvement of the outsider."

The plays of Athol Fugard have been regularly premiered in fringe theatres in South Africa, London (Royal Court Theatre) and New York. Olive Schreiner's The Story of an African Farm (1883) was a revelation in Victorian literature: it is heralded by many as introducing feminism into the novel form.

Breyten Breytenbach was jailed for his involvement with the guerrilla movement against apartheid. André Brink was the first Afrikaner writer to be banned by the government after he released the novel A Dry White Season.

Cuisine 

The cuisine of South Africa is diverse, and foods from many different cultures and backgrounds are enjoyed by all communities, and especially marketed to tourists who wish to sample the large variety available. South Africa has also developed into a major wine producer, with some of the best vineyards lying in valleys around Stellenbosch, Franschhoek, Paarl and Barrydale.

Sports 

 
South Africa's most popular sports are association football, rugby union and cricket. Other sports with significant support are swimming, athletics, golf, boxing, tennis, rugby league, ringball, field hockey, surfing and netball. Although football (soccer) commands the greatest following among the youth, other sports like basketball, judo, softball and skateboarding are becoming increasingly popular amongst the populace.

Association football is the most popular sport in South Africa. Footballers who have played for major foreign clubs include Steven Pienaar, Lucas Radebe and Philemon Masinga, Benni McCarthy, Aaron Mokoena, and Delron Buckley. South Africa hosted the 2010 FIFA World Cup, and FIFA president Sepp Blatter awarded South Africa a grade 9 out of 10 for successfully hosting the event. Player Benni McCarthy is also a first-team coach for the English football club Manchester United.

Famous boxing personalities include Baby Jake Jacob Matlala, Vuyani Bungu, Welcome Ncita, Dingaan Thobela, Corrie Sanders, Gerrie Coetzee and Brian Mitchell. Durban surfer Jordy Smith won the 2010 Billabong J-Bay Open making him the highest ranked surfer in the world. South Africa produced Formula One motor racing's 1979 world champion Jody Scheckter. Famous active cricket players include Kagiso Rabada, David Miller, Keshav Maharaj, Anrich Nortje, Reeza Hendricks and Rilee Rossouw; some also participate in the Indian Premier League.

South Africa has produced numerous world class rugby players, including Francois Pienaar, Joost van der Westhuizen, Danie Craven, Frik du Preez, Naas Botha, and Bryan Habana. South Africa has won the Rugby World Cup three times, tying New Zealand for the most Rugby World Cup wins. South Africa first won the 1995 Rugby World Cup, which it hosted. They went on to win the tournament again in 2007 and in 2019. It followed the 1995 Rugby World Cup by hosting the 1996 African Cup of Nations, with the national team Bafana Bafana going on to win the tournament. In 2022, the women's team also won the Women's Africa Cup of Nations, beating Morocco 2–1 in the final. It also hosted the 2003 Cricket World Cup, the 2007 World Twenty20 Championship. South Africa's national cricket team, the Proteas, have also won the inaugural edition of the 1998 ICC KnockOut Trophy by defeating West Indies in the final. The 2023 ICC Women's T20 World Cup was hosted in South Africa and the women's team came in second place. South Africa's national blind cricket team also went on to win the inaugural edition of the Blind Cricket World Cup in 1998.

In 2004, the swimming team of Roland Schoeman, Lyndon Ferns, Darian Townsend and Ryk Neethling won the gold medal at the Olympic Games in Athens, simultaneously breaking the world record in the 4×100 Freestyle Relay. Penny Heyns won Olympic Gold in the 1996 Atlanta Olympic Games, and more recently, swimmers Tatjana Schoenmaker and Lara van Niekerk have both broken world records and won gold medals at the Olympic and Commonwealth Games. In 2012, Oscar Pistorius became the first double amputee sprinter to compete at the Olympic Games in London. In golf, Gary Player is generally regarded as one of the greatest golfers of all time, having won the Career Grand Slam, one of five golfers to have done so. Other South African golfers to have won major tournaments include Bobby Locke, Ernie Els, Retief Goosen, Tim Clark, Trevor Immelman, Louis Oosthuizen and Charl Schwartzel.

See also 

 Outline of South Africa
 Timeline of South Africa

References

Further reading 

 A History of South Africa, Third Edition. Leonard Thompson. Yale University Press. 2001. 384 pages. .
 Economic Analysis and Policy Formulation for Post-Apartheid South Africa: Mission Report, Aug. 1991. International Development Research Centre. IDRC Canada, 1991. vi, 46 p. Without ISBN.
 Emerging Johannesburg: Perspectives on the Postapartheid City. Richard Tomlinson, et al. 2003. 336 pages. .
 Making of Modern South Africa: Conquest, Segregation and Apartheid. Nigel Worden. 2000. 194 pages. .
 South Africa: A Narrative History. Frank Welsh. Kodansha America. 1999. 606 pages. .
 South Africa in Contemporary Times. Godfrey Mwakikagile. New Africa Press. 2008. 260 pages. .
 The Atlas of Changing South Africa. A. J. Christopher. 2000. 216 pages. .
 The Politics of the New South Africa. Heather Deegan. 2000. 256 pages. .
 Twentieth-Century South Africa. William Beinart Oxford University Press 2001, 414 pages, .

External links 

 Government of South Africa
 South Africa. The World Factbook. Central Intelligence Agency.
 South Africa from UCB Libraries GovPubs
 South Africa from the BBC News

 South Africa luxury travel from Scott Dunn

 
 

South Africa
BRICS nations
Countries in Africa
English-speaking countries and territories
G20 nations
Member states of the African Union
Member states of the Commonwealth of Nations
Member states of the United Nations
Newly industrializing countries
Republics in the Commonwealth of Nations
Southern African countries
States and territories established in 1910